Parachrysina borealis is a beetle of the Family Scarabaeidae.

Rutelinae